Vincent R. Balletta Jr. (July 7, 1927 – October 4, 1996) was an American politician who served in the New York State Assembly from the 18th district from 1967 to 1970.

Prior to serving in the New York State Assembly, Balletta served as a member of the North Hempstead Town Council between 1959 and 1966.

He died of cancer on October 4, 1996, in Port Washington, New York at age 69.

References

1927 births
1996 deaths
Republican Party members of the New York State Assembly
20th-century American politicians